Maryan (pronounced Mariyāņ) is a 2013 Indian Tamil-language drama film directed by Bharat Bala, and produced by Venu Ravichandran, under the banner Aascar Films, starring Dhanush and Parvathy Thiruvothu.  The film has music and background score composed by A. R. Rahman; cinematography and editing were done by Marc Koninckx and Vivek Harshan respectively. The dialogues in the film were penned by Joe D' Cruz. Oscar-award winner Resul Pookutty was the sound designer of the film. Maryan is an emotional journey of a common man to an unknown place with the hope to come home and lead a better life. The film's title represents the character as "a man who never dies".

The film revolves around a story of human survival adapted from a newspaper article of a real-life crisis event, when three oil workers from Tamil Nadu were kidnapped and taken hostage in Sudan by mercenaries. Bharatbala narrated the story to Dhanush on September 2011, and the film was announced officially on March 2012, revealing the details of the cast and crew. The commencement of the principal photography took place on the same date, and was primarily shot across Sudan and Kanyakumari in Tamil Nadu. The underwater scenes were filmed in Andamans and scenes featuring arid land were filmed at Rann of Kutch in Gujarat.

The film released in Auro 3D sound format on selective screens in India and worldwide on 19 July 2013. The film received positive critical reception in India. The film had the biggest opening in the United States amongst all Indian films releasing on the same date. However, in Tamil Nadu the film was declared as an average grosser. The dubbed Telugu version of the film titled Mariyaan was released on 11 September 2015.

Plot
Mariyaan Joseph is a fisherman in a village named Neerody in Kanyakumari. He has an auspicious bond with sea and proudly claims himself as "Kadal Raasa" (King of Ocean). Panimalar falls in love with Maryan and does not shy away in confessing it to him. Maryan is loved and longed by Panimalar, but sadly, her feelings are not reciprocated. The more Maryan tries to keep Panimalar away from him, the closer she tries to get. This eventually leads to him falling for her. Once, Panimalar is caught in unfortunate circumstances and to support her financially, Maryan is forced to take up employment on contract basis for two years in Sudan. He then befriends Saami, and he is his only companion for Four years. He successfully completes his tenure and packs bags in jubilation to return to his ladylove, but tragedy strikes in the form of Sudanese terrorists, who end up kidnapping Maryan and two of his coworkers, demanding money for their freedom. One of his coworkers gets killed by the head terrorist. After 21 days in captivity, Maryan escapes with Saami and runs for his life. He gets separated from Saami, who gets killed later on, and gets lost in the desert and suffers from dehydration and confronts cheetahs as his mirage. After finding the coast, he fights the terrorist who catches up with him and escapes. He then returns to his village where his love is waiting for him.

Cast

 Dhanush as Maryan Vijayan Joseph
 Parvathy Thiruvothu as Panimalar
 Jagan as Sami
 Appukutty as Sakkarai
 Uma Riyaz Khan as Seeli
 Salim Kumar as Thomayya
 Vinayakan as Theekkurissi
 Imman Annachi as Kuttyandi
 Ankur Vikal as Bappan
 Christopher Minnie as Head Terrorist
 Barry Mydou as Al-Jazeera
 Dagbeh Tweh
 Hari Krishnan
 Joe D'Cruz as Negotiator at Hospital (cameo role)

Production

Development

In early 2011, director Bharat Bala read about a 2008 incident involving three immigrant oil workers from India being kidnapped in the Darfur region of Sudan and how they had managed to escape from post being hostages. While improvising his script, the director met the former hostages who were held for 21 days under captivity. In late September 2011, the director narrated the first half of the film script to actor Dhanush and he agreed play the character Maryan. During this time, the filmmaker was done with half of the screenplay. Following his casting in the film, actor Dhanush became involved in character and screenplay-related discussions that were carried on for six months. In March 2012, the film and collaborations were officially announced. After a lot of research, the director came up with the film title and stated it is the name of the character. In Tamil it translates to "A man who never dies". As per the film script, it implies that the spirit of the man never dies.

The director opined that the fishing community in southern India goes through terrible hardship and countries like Nigeria, Sudan, Libya borrow them as hard labor. The character played by actor Dhanush is a physically strong, economically poor but simple man from a very remote village who was in need of a job and hence, this forms the outline of the film. Parvathy was signed on to play a key role as character Maryan's love interest in the film. The director was inspired by the 2008 French-Liberian film Johnny Mad Dog, which starred a real-life group of LURD child soldiers and subsequently chose them as well as the cinematographer of that film, Marc Koninckx, to be a part of Maryan.

A press release from March 2013 along with a poster revealed the film's outline as "A young man is faced with adversity. Life deals him immense challenges, and forces him to struggle to thrive. But he does, nevertheless, fighting to survive by thriving on the sheer undying spirit of the human will to survive. Along his thrilling journey is a tryst with adventure, a smattering of drama and a gritty tale that shows the power of love in extreme circumstances. And that is the story of Maryan." In an interview with Zee News, Bharatbala quoted, "Even though it (Maryan) is about the fight for survival, it deals with several other emotions such as love, separation and struggle. The story recounts a beautiful journey about the separation of the protagonist from his loved ones and his struggle to reunite".

Filming
As the film's story takes place in Sudan and in Kanyakumari, India, Bharatbala noted that filming had to take place in two contrasting terrains. The sandy rugged locations in Africa were shot in Liberia, made to look like Sudan, and several other portions were shot in a month. Subsequent close-up scenes featuring supporting cast members from Africa were filmed in India. The first schedule of the film began in Namibia, with scenes including a fight sequence supervised by Dilip Subarayan, being canned. The song "Nenje Ezhu" was shot in Namibia's Coastal Deserts featuring the leading duo. Dhanush also shared screen space with a cheetah.

The final schedule of the film started in Nagercoil, Tamil Nadu in November 2012 and filming took place over a couple of months throughout the coastal region of South India. Filming was also held in Mandaikadapudur village close to Kanyakumari, India, named as Neerodi in the film. The entire film was shot in reverse with the climax scenes being filmed first and hence the last scene shot was the beginning scene of the film. Dhanush underwent a special ocean diving course, to swim up to 50 feet underwater. Bharat Bala said that Dhanush would jump with the diving suit, go deep, settle down and get rid of the suit and then surge for the actual shot. Dhanush had two underwater support divers to supply him air during the underwater scenes. The underwater scenes were filmed in Andamans. Certain arid land scenes were also shot at Rann of Kutch in Gujarat.

The film incorporates firm Barco NV's Auro 11.1 surround sound technology. The re-recording in the Auro format was done at composer A R Rahman's AM Studios making it the first Tamil film to mix native sounds in the format. Bharatbala claimed, one would find three different contrasting uses of the Auro 3D sound in the film. First, in the fishing village and the feel of the ocean surface, then deep into the desert and the sonic sounds and textures of the ocean, 50–55 feet under the water. He revealed through Twitter that the film's digital intermediate works were completed by 9 July 2013. Scenes during the making of the movie were placed with the end credits of the film.

Soundtrack

The music and background score of the film was composed by A. R. Rahman. The complete soundtrack album was released at the composer's recording studio in Chennai on 17 May 2013, along with Raanjhanaa, another album composed by Rahman. The album was also made available as mastered for iTunes version. The day after release, the track "Nenjae Ezhu" topped all the charts with over one crore online listeners. After one month of the release of the soundtrack album, the songs "Nenjae Ezhu" and "Kadal Raasa Naan" attained the peak position on the Radio Mirchi South Top 20 charts, whereas "Sonapareeya" peaked at #3 and "Innum Konjam Neram" at #18. The soundtrack album was entitled as "Tamil Album of Year" in iTunes’ Best of 2013.

Controversies
The third teaser as well as a promotional film poster depicting a smoking Dhanush were criticised by former Union Minister of Health and Family Welfare of India, Anbumani Ramadoss. He claimed that the scenes prioritise smoking in the movie and hence it is a punishable offence to appear smoking in cinemas. Following this, reports claimed that the actor was in discussions with the director for the removal of such contents from the film.

Marketing
The first official poster of the film was released on 28 March 2013. A thirty-second teaser featuring only Dhanush only released on 29 March 2013. On 31 March 2013, another 40-second teaser with a musical score was released that showed Dhanush with a spear in his hand, diving into deep sea in a breath and hunting on the seabed. The third teaser of 30 seconds was released on 4 April 2013. It depicted the actor fighting and smoking. The teaser of the song "Nenje Ezhu" was released on 26 April 2013. It crossed over three lakh views on YouTube in less than two days. A. R. Rahman extended an invitation through YouTube for the premiere of the song "Nenjae Ezhu" on 3 May 2013. The official trailer was released on 1 May 2013. After the trailer garnered nearly seven lakh views in one day on Sony India's music channel, it was re-released as an upgraded Vevo version. On 13 June 2013, a press meet headed by the director claimed that the film utilised the Auro 3D sound technology. The actor, director and the music composer promoted the film at an event at Jaya TV studios that was aired live on 23 June 2013.

The promotions for the dubbed Telugu version of the film began from February 2015. The dubbed trailer was released on 14 February 2015.

Release
The satellite rights of the film were secured by Jaya TV. Initially set to release on 31 May 2013, due to post-production and re-recording works, the release date was changed to 21 June 2013. There was a scarcity of scrutiny theatres for the certification process so, the film was censored on 17 June 2013. The film was given a U/A certificate by the Censor Board for its theme and some violence in the climax. However, it was re-censored to exempt itself from entertainment tax and hence, was given a U certificate. The release date of 21 June 2013 was cancelled to avoid clash with Dhanush's Hindi debut film Raanjhanaa and delayed process for censoring. The film was eventually released on 19 July 2013.

The estimate number of screens of the film in Tamil Nadu were 350. As of July 2013, 27 screens out of these were equipped with the Auro 3D surround sound. The release in remaining India would be 100. Maryan wasn't released in Andhra Pradesh whereas out of 50 screens all over Karnataka, the film released on 39 screens in Bangalore, three in Mysuru, two in Mangaluru and rest in other areas of the state. In Kerala, distribution rights were acquired by Sagara Entertainment, releasing the film in about 79 screens. The Telugu version was distributed by SVR Media.

Bharat Creations secured the distribution rights of the film in the United States and North America. The screens in United States were 25 whereas 6 in Canada. The film was also released in several UK cities. A special screening of the film was held at Mumbai on 11 August 2013.

The dubbed Telugu version of the film was released nearly two years later on 11 September 2015.

Reception

Critical reception
The film received generally positive reviews upon release. The film's technicalities, performances of the lead actors and the score were applauded by the critics.

At The Times of India, N Venkateswaran gave the film 4 out of 5 stars and quoted, "A soulful love story, but candy floss is not on the menu." At The New Indian Express, Malini Mannath wrote, "Cocktail of love and action, lyrical in its narrative style in the first half, the film could, however, have done with more coherence and conviction in its second half". Sandesh of One India Entertainment summarised, "Dhanush's sufferings on-screen, bursting and agony during emotional scenes have come out well. The film is a must watch for Dhanush's fans." He gave the film 3.5 stars out of 5. S Sarawasthi of Rediff gave the film 3 stars out of 5 and claimed, "Mariyaan is a beautiful love story. However, what brings the film down a notch is the pace, especially the second half, which seems to drag quite a bit. And though the film may not appeal to all, it is definitely a must watch." Critical review board at Behindwoods gave the verdict, "A film with breathtaking visuals, heart-stopping music, terrifically talented cast set on a very leisurely paced narrative." They rated 3 on a scale of 5 Baradwaj Rangan of The Hindu noted, "A wonderful romance, but needed to be more." Vivek Ramz of in.com summarised, "'Mariyaan' is a realistic and touching love saga and definitely deserves a watch! Better watch it in Auro 3D screen to experience it best." He rated the film 3.5 stars out of 5.

Box office
International
At the Box Office of United States, the film had the biggest opening amongst all Indian films releasing on the same date. In its opening weekend, at the UK and Ireland Box Office the film has collected £13,675 on 5 screens.

Domestic
In Coimbatore, Neelagiri, Erode and Tirupur, it crossed the  mark by 10 days. By end July 2013, a total of 55 screens were screening the movie. In Kanchipuram two theatres alone, the film grossed . Overall, the weekdays in the first week had 80% theatre occupancy.

In the second week number of weekend shows in Chennai were 306 and average theatre occupancy was 65%. The collections for the weekend grossed . During the subsequent weekdays, number of shows in Chennai were 600 with theatre occupancy 60% and the film grossed . The second weekend experienced a drop compared to the first, but prime multiplexes reported near full houses. All over Karnataka, especially in Bengaluru City the film opened with a mixed response and second weekend's occupancy was less than 40% at the multiplexes.

In the third week number of weekend shows in Chennai were 117 and average theatre occupancy was degraded to 55%. The collections for the weekend grossed . For the following weekdays, number of shows in Chennai were 372 with theatre occupancy 40% and the film grossed .

After a month of the film release, weekend shows in the same city were 39 and average theatre occupancy further dipped to 40%. The collections for the weekend grossed . For the subsequent weekdays, number of shows in Chennai were 132 with theatre occupancy 30% and the film grossed .

Accolades

References

External links

2013 films
Films shot in Namibia
Films about hostage takings
Journalism adapted into films
2010s Tamil-language films
Films scored by A. R. Rahman
Indian films based on actual events
2013 directorial debut films